Elections in Andhra Pradesh state, India are conducted in accordance with the Constitution of India. The Assembly of Andhra Pradesh creates laws regarding the conduct of local body elections unilaterally while any changes by the state legislature to the conduct of state level elections need to be approved by the Parliament of India. In addition, the state legislature may be dismissed by the Parliament according to Article 356 of the Indian Constitution and President's rule may be imposed.

Andhra Pradesh electoral system
In 2014, Andhra Pradesh (Total 294 seats) was bifurcated into Andhra Pradesh (175 seats) and Telangana (119 seats) states.

National level representation

Lok Sabha delegation
Andhra Pradesh is represented by a total of 25 MPs in the Lok Sabha. From the total of 25 seats, 20 belong to the general category candidates and the other 5 are reserved for the SC/ST category. In the 2019 Indian general election, out of 25 seats, Yuvajana Sramika Rythu Congress Party won a majority of 22 seats, while others Telugu Desam Party managed to win 3 seats.

Rajya Sabha delegation
Both houses of the state legislature jointly nominate Members to the Rajya Sabha.

State level representations

Legislative Assembly

The Andhra Pradesh legislature assembly has 175 seats. For the election of its members, the state is divided into 175 Assembly Constituencies in which the candidate securing the largest number of votes is declared elected. In the Andhra Pradesh Assembly Elections 2019, the YSR Congress Party formed the state government having an outstanding majority of 151 seats, 20 seats of TDP ,1 With JSP & 3 As Indipendents (represented by ASSEMBLY SPEAKER)

Legislative Council

The Upper House known as the Legislative Council has lesser powers than the Assembly and several of its members are nominated by the Assembly; others are elected from various sections of society, such as Graduates and Teachers. Currently the Legislative Council consists of 58 members.

Electoral history
The first general elections were conducted in Andhra state in 1955, for 196 constituencies representing 11 Districts. In 1956, the United Andhra Pradesh State Legislative Assembly had 294 seats representing 23 districts. From 1956 to 1958 the United Andhra Pradesh Legislature was Unicameral and from 1958 when the council was formed the Legislative Council was abolished and the United Andhra Pradesh Legislature became Unicameral once again, until March 2007 when it was re-established and elections were held for its seats as per The Andhra Pradesh Legislative Council Bill, 2004. From 2014 there are 175 constituencies in Andhra Legislative Assembly and 58 constituencies Andhra Legislative Council.

Main political parties
YSR Congress Party (YSRCP), Telugu Desam Party (TDP), Jana Sena Party (JSP), Indian National Congress (INC), Bharatiya Janata Party (BJP), Communist Party of India (CPI), Communist Party of India (Marxist) (CPIM).

General election (Lok Sabha)

Andhra state (1953–1956) 
Total Seats – 28

United Andhra Pradesh (1956–2014) 
Total Seats – 43 (1957 & 1962)Total Seats – 41 (1967 & 1971)Total Seats – 42 (from 1977)

Andhra Pradesh (2014-) 
Total Seats – 25

Assembly (Saasana sabha) elections

Andhra state (1953–1956)

Andhra Pradesh (1956–2014)

Andhra Pradesh 
In 2014, Andhra Pradesh (Total 294) was bifurcated into Telangana (119) and Andhra Pradesh (175) states.

Performance of Political Parties

History of political parties

The Indian National Congress (INC) won a majority of seats at the state level continuously from the formation of the state until 1983 when the Telugu Desam Party (TDP) was formed by Actor N.T.Rama Rao, the first non-Congress government in the state. From 1984 to 2004, the politics of the state was essentially a two party system. The INC regained the state from 1989 to 1994.

The TDP formed the state government from 1995 to 2004. In 2004, the INC formed the government again. This government also completed its second term having won the Assembly elections in 2009. The Praja Rajyam Party (PRP) was formed in 2008 by Telugu Film Actor Chiranjeevi; that party won the third largest number of seats in the 2009 state assembly elections and then merged into congress. After the death of the chief minister Y. S. Rajashekar Reddy his son Y. S. Jagan Mohan Reddy came into the lime light. He has resigned from congress after disputes with congress leadership at center. The TDP forms the principal opposition party in the state assembly during this time.

The state had an ongoing sub-regionalist Telangana movement with the Telangana Rashtra Samithi (TRS) being formed in 2001 on this platform. And under the leadership of K Chandrashekar Rao separate state of Telangana was carved out of Andhra Pradesh. Then during next elections TDP had emerged with highest number of seats after fighting the elections with BJP and Pawan Kalyan who was entering politics during that time. Y. S. Jagan Mohan Reddy has formed a new party after resigning from congress named Y. S. R Congress party which was the main opposition from 2014–2019. During this period JanaSena the party of Pawan Kalyan cut ties with TDP due to conflict on special status of Andhra Pradesh which was one of the commitments during the states bifurcation in 2014. Also TDP cut ties with BJP in 2019 for the same reason.

During 2019 Assembly and Lok Sabha elections YSR congress party won with a landslide victory in both elections. Currently TDP is in opposition in the state assembly. JanaSena getting third highest percentage of votes and both BJP and Congress became small parties in Andhra Pradesh

Election Commission
Elections in Andhra Pradesh are conducted by the Election Commission of India whose state level head is the Chief Election Commissioner of Andhra Pradesh, the authority created under the Constitution.  It is a well established convention that once the election process commences, no courts intervene until the results are declared by the election commission.  During the elections, vast powers are assigned to the election commission to the extent that it can function as a civil court, if needed.

Electoral process

The latest election in Andhra Pradesh were conducted in two phases. All citizens of India above 18 years of age are eligible to enrol as voters in the electoral rolls.  It is the responsibility of the eligible voters to enrol.  Normally, voter registrations are allowed at latest one week prior to the last date for nomination of candidates.

Pre elections
The Election Commission's Model Code of Conduct enters into force as soon as the notification for polls is issued.  This places restrictions on the campaigning by political parties as well as prohibits certain government actions that would unduly influence the election.

Voting day
The electoral process is the same as in the rest of India with Electronic Voting Machines being used for all Lok Sabha and State Assembly elections.

Post elections
After the election day, the EVMs are stood stored in a strong room under heavy security. After the different phases of the elections are complete, a day is set to count the votes. The votes are tallied and typically, the verdict is known within hours. The candidate who has mustered the most votes is declared the winner of the constituency.

The party or coalition that has won the most seats is invited by the Governor to form the new government. The coalition or party must prove its majority in the floor of the house (Legislative Assembly) in a vote of confidence by obtaining a simple majority (minimum 50%) of the votes in the House.

Absentee voting
As of now, India does not have an absentee ballot system. Section 19 of The Representation of the People Act (RPA)-1950 allows people to register to vote whore above 18 years of age and an 'ordinary resident' of the residing constituency i.e. living at the current address for 6 months or longer. Section 20 of the above Act disqualifies non-resident Indians (NRI) from getting their name registered in the electoral rolls. Consequently, it also prevents an NRI from casting a vote in elections to the Parliament and to the State Legislatures.

The Representation of the People (Amendment) 2006 Bill was introduced in the Parliament by Shri Hanraj Bharadwaj, Minister of Law and Justice during February 2006 with an objective to amend Section 20 of the RPA-1950 to enable NRIs to vote. Despite the report submitted by the Parliamentary Standing Committee two years ago, the Government has so far failed to act on the recommendations. The Bill was reintroduced in the 2008 budget session of the Parliament to the Lok Sabha. But no action taken once again.

Several civic society organisations have urged the government to amend the RPA act to allow NRI's and people on the move to cast their vote through absentee ballot system.

Further reading
 Subrata K. Mitra and V. B. Singh. 1999. Democracy and Social Change in India: A Cross-Sectional Analysis of the National Electorate. New Delhi: Sage Publications.  (India HB)  (U.S. HB).
 Subrata K. Mitra, Mike Enskat, Clemens Spiess (eds.). 2004. Political Parties in South Asia. Greenwood: Praeger.
 Subrata K. Mitra/Mike Enskat/V. B. Singh. 2001. India, in: Nohlen, Dieter (Ed.). Elections in Asia and the Pacific: A Data Handbook. Vol. I. Oxford: Oxford University Press

See also
 List of Assembly constituencies of Andhra Pradesh
 List of Lok Sabha Constituencies
 Elections in India
 49-O Popularly known as 'No Vote'
 List Of All 175 MLA Candidates Who’ve Won In Andhra Pradesh State Assembly Elections 2019
 List of chairpersons of the Andhra Pradesh Legislative Council

References

External links
 Andhra Pradesh State Election Commission
 Election Commission of India
 Assembly Elections
 Elections in India History and information
 News Related to 2009 Elections in India
 Social Media Conversations of Indian Elections 2009
 Andhra Pradesh Lok Sabha Election 2019
 AP Information in Telugu